The International Institute of Welding (IIW) is an international scientific and engineering body for welding, brazing and related technologies. Its membership consists of the national welding societies from around the world. The Institute was founded in 1948 by 13 national societies. By 2011 its membership has expanded to 55 national welding societies.

Organization
The general assembly of the national societies defines the policy of the institute and elects its president and a board of directors. A permanent secretariat deals with regular day-to-day activities and maintains contact with other international bodies.

The institute has established a number of technical commissions, each one covering a relatively broad subject of welding science and technology. Under some of them there exist a number of technical sub-commissions, each one involved in a more specific aspect. The IIW participates in International Organization for Standardization (ISO) standardization activities in Technical Committee TC44 (welding and allied processes). A total of 21 ISO standards and updates have been published under the direct responsibility of IIW.

Publications
The Institute publishes Welding in the World, a bimonthly international scientific, technical and trade journal.

See also
 American Welding Society
 Canadian Welding Bureau
 European Federation for Welding, Joining and Cutting

References

External links
 International Institute of Welding A world of joining experienceIIW website
 

Welding organizations